= Opinion polling on the impeachment of Dilma Rousseff =

Surveying on removal of president of Brazil

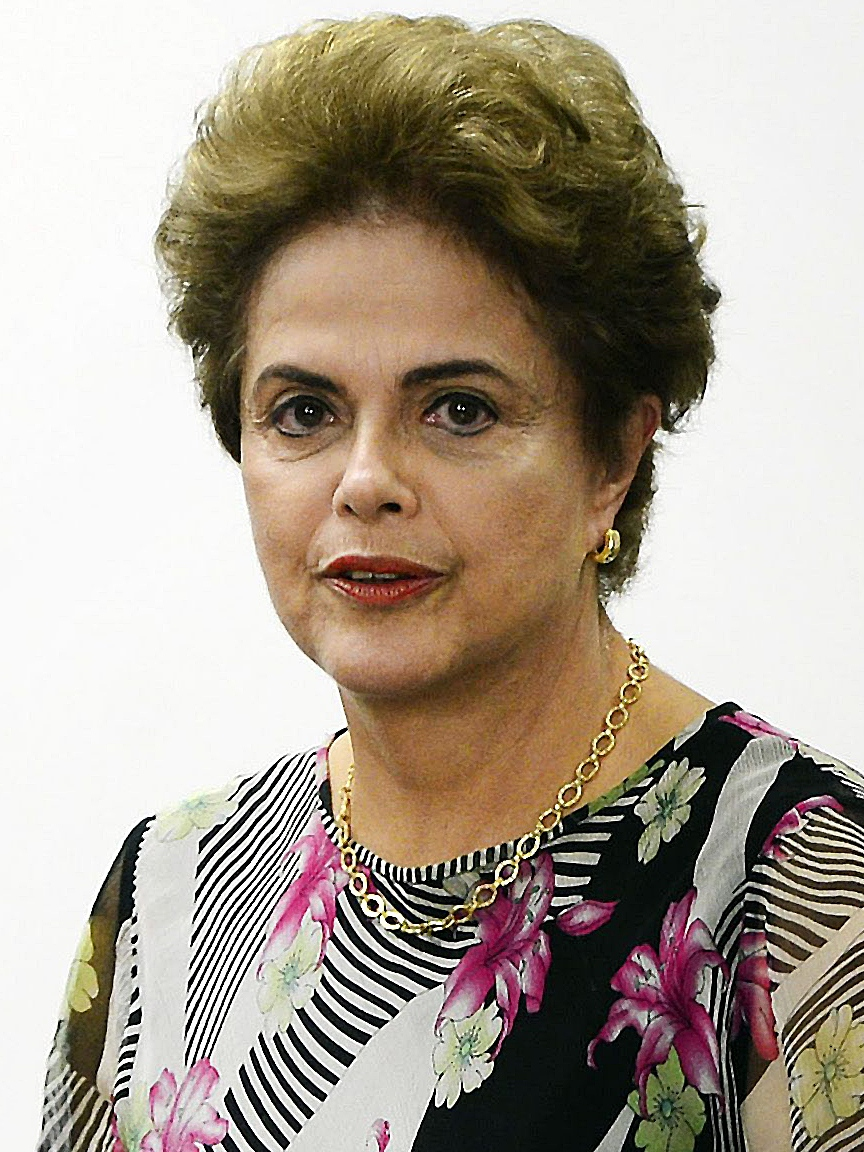
Then-president Dilma Rousseff in February 2016.

Since the impeachment of Dilma Rousseff as President of Brazil became a subject of debate and taking a lot of space in the media, the main polling institutes of the country made many opinion polls about it.

== Opinion polls ==
=== Public opinion ===
In general, the questions made to electors were: "Should Dilma Rousseff be removed from the Presidency?" or "Should the National Congress open an impeachment process against President Dilma?"

Polling group	Date	Sample size	Yes	No	Unsure / No opinion	Net ±							
Polling group	Date	Sample size	Yes	No	Unsure / No opinion	Net ±	Vox Populi	9–12 Apr 2016	2,000	57%	38%	6%	+28%
Datafolha	7–8 April 2016	2,779	61%	33%	6%	+28%							
Ideia Inteligência	28–29 Mar 2016	10,005	69%	31%	–	+38%							
Datafolha	17–18 Mar 2016	2,794	68%	27%	5%	+41%							
Datafolha	24–25 Feb 2016	2,768	60%	33%	7%	+27%							
CNT	17–18 Feb 2016	2,002	55.6%	40.3%	4.1%	+21.2%							
Ipsos	26–27 Jan 2016	1,200	60%	22%	18%	+38%							
Paraná Pesquisas	22–26 Jan 2016	2,004	59.4%	38.2%	2.4%	+21.2%							
Datafolha	16–17 Dec 2015	2,810	60%	34%	6%	+26%							
Ibope	5–9 Dec 2015	2,002	67%	28%	4%	+39%							
Datafolha	24–25 Nov 2015	3,541	65%	30%	5%	+35%							
CNT/MDA	20–24 Oct 2015	2,002	61.3%	33.8%	4.9%	+27.5%							
Datafolha	6 Aug 2015	3,358	66%	28%	5%	+38%							
CNT/MDA	21 Jul 2015	2,002	62.8%	32.1%	5.1%	+30.7%							
Datafolha	11 Apr 2015	2,834	63%	33%	4%	+30%							
CNT/MDA	21 Mar 2015	2,002	59.7%	34.7%	5.6%	+25.0%							

Results may not always add to 100% due rounding methodology employed by various polling groups.

Polling aggregates key
Impeachment support
Yes
No
Unsure/No Opinion

=== Federal Deputies ===
Datafolha also interviewed 315 federal deputies, between 7 and 18 December 2015. 215 congressmen and congresswomen (42%) were favorable to the impeach. As 342 votes were needed, there were 127 votes to go. On the other side, 159 deputies (31%) said that they would vote against the impeachment, so 12 more votes were needed to reach the 171 votes, which would avoid the process. The 27% left were indecised. Among the government supporters, 26% of them were favorable and 33% of the PMDB members wanted the impeachment. The poll should a slight improvement for President Rousseff, comparing to another poll published in October 2015.
